The 1990 Penrith Panthers season was the 24th in the club's history. Coached by Phil Gould and captained by Royce Simmons, they competed in the New South Wales Rugby League's 1990 Winfield Cup Premiership, finishing 3rd (out of 16). The Panthers were beaten in the Grand Final by the Canberra Raiders.

References

Penrith Panthers seasons
Penrith Panthers season
Penrith Panthers season